= Vullithota =

- Village
- Interactive map of Vullithota
- Location in Andhra Pradesh, India
- Coordinates: 17.002015°N 81.769812°E
- Country: India
- State: Andhra Pradesh
- Region: Rajahmundry
- District: East Godavari district

Languages
  - Official: Telugu
- Time zone: UTC+5:30 (IST)
- PIN: 533101

Vullithota is a village situated in East Godavari district in Rajahmundry Urban, in Andhra Pradesh State.
